Dolichoderus cogitans is a species of ant in the genus Dolichoderus. Described by Forel in 1912, the species is endemic to Bolivia and Brazil.

References

Dolichoderus
Hymenoptera of South America
Insects described in 1912